Adèle Exarchopoulos (born 22 November 1993 in Paris) is a French actress. She is best known for her leading role as Adèle in Blue Is the Warmest Colour (2013), for which she earned international attention and critical acclaim; at the 2013 Cannes Film Festival, she became the youngest person in the history of the festival to be awarded the Palme d'Or. For her performance in Blue Is the Warmest Colour, she won the Los Angeles Film Critics Association Award for Best Actress, the César Award for Most Promising Actress, and the Trophée Chopard Award for Female Revelation of the Year, among dozens of other accolades.

Early life
Exarchopoulos grew up in the 19th arrondissement of Paris, near the Place des Fêtes. Her father, Didier Exarchopoulos, whose father was Greek, is a guitar teacher, and her mother, Marina Niquet, is a French nurse.

Career 
In 2006, Exarchopoulos was spotted by an agent and made her first television appearance in an episode of the French police series R.I.S, police scientifique. At thirteen, she had a role in the 2007 film Boxes. She also appeared in the films Les Enfants de Timpelbach (2008), The Round Up (2010), Turk's Head (2010), Chez Gino (2011), Carré blanc (2011), Pieces of Me (2012) and I Used to Be Darker (2013). 

She attracted international attention and critical acclaim for her performance in Blue Is the Warmest Colour, a 2013 film based on the 2010 French graphic novel of the same name. The film won the Palme d'Or at the 2013 Cannes Film Festival. Exarchopoulos and co-star Léa Seydoux were awarded the Palme d'Or alongside director Abdellatif Kechiche, becoming the only women apart from director Jane Campion to have won the award; Exarchopoulos is the youngest person to ever receive the award.

She received critical praise and her performance was cited as one of the year's best. Indiewire critic Eric Kohn stated that he believed Exarchopoulos' performance was the best female performance of 2013. Her performance was praised for its "rawness."

Exarchopoulos discussed her process with The New York Times, explaining: "Abdellatif tried to keep us close to reality. He asked us to play with our own emotions. For example, I kept my own voice. It’s very subtle, very delicate, the things that are a part of you and the things that are a part of your character". In March 2014, she was in consideration to play Tiger Lily in Pan but lost to Rooney Mara. She then appeared in The Last Face alongside Javier Bardem and Charlize Theron, directed by Sean Penn, which premiered in competition for the Palme d'Or at the 2016 Cannes Film Festival.

She plays Judith in the 2015 period drama film Les Anarchistes. She also appeared in Racer and the Jailbird, a film by Belgian film director Michaël R. Roskam, and Orphan, a French film by Arnaud des Pallières in 2017.

Personal life 
Exarchopoulos and actor Jérémie Laheurte began dating in 2012 during the filming of Blue Is the Warmest Colour, but they ended their relationship in 2015. She and her partner, French rapper Mamadou Coulibaly, known as Doums, member of French hip hop collective group L'entourage, have a son, born in 2017. They separated in 2021.

Filmography

Film

Television

Theatre

Awards and nominations

References

External links

 
 

1993 births
Living people
French film actresses
French people of Greek descent
French television actresses
21st-century French actresses
Most Promising Actress Lumières Award winners
People from Paris
Actresses from Paris
Most Promising Actress César Award winners
Chopard Trophy for Female Revelation winners